The 1980–81 Scottish Premier Division title was won by Celtic, with 2 matches still to play on 22 April 1981, after defeating Dundee United 3–2 at Tannadice Park. They finished seven points ahead of closest challengers Aberdeen. Kilmarnock and Heart of Midlothian were relegated.

Table

Results

Matches 1–18
During matches 1–18 each team plays every other team twice (home and away).

Matches 19–36
During matches 19–36 each team plays every other team twice (home and away).

References
1980–81 Scottish Premier Division – Statto

Scottish Premier Division seasons
1
Scot